River Tud is a tributary of the River Wensum, Norfolk in the East of England.

Course

The Tud  passes through the villages of North Tuddenham, Hockering, East Tuddenham, Honingham, Easton, Costessey and finally flows under the Marriott's Way before joining the Wensum at Hellesdon Mill.

Ecology
The Tud's water is crystal clear, shallow, fast-flowing and has lush weed beds full of aquatic life including crayfish, lampreys, bullheads, freshwater shrimps and stone loach.

Angling
The river is well known for the quality dace fishing. Trout can also be caught particularly in the upper reaches. Angling is mostly private. The river has suffered from the odd case of pollution.

Further reading
Where to Fish in Norfolk and Suffolk by John Wilson

External links

Tud, river
2Tud